Muse India is a literary e-journal based in Hyderabad, India. Since 2005, it has appeared bi-monthly in a web edition; it has no print version. In June 2017, Muse India was approved by the UGC as a literary e-journal. Its founder and managing editor is G Surya Prakash Rao.

Focus and scope
Muse India is an open-access journal publishing English-language poetry, short fiction, and essays by Indian authors, including texts originally written in English and translations from other languages of India. It also publishes book reviews and author interviews.

Contents
Muse India has included work by Dalit Panther activists such as Meena Kandasamy and Gujarati Dalit poet Kisan Sosa, as well as notable writers such as Amrita Pritam, Babu Suthar, Akhil Katyal, Sreyash Sarkar, Bharat Gupt and Vihang A. Naik. Notable non-Indian guest writers/contributors have also been featured in the journal, including Omer Tarin, Baidar Bakht, Zehra Nigah, Marjorie Evasco, Edwin Thumboo, Kishwar Naheed and others.

See also 
List of literary magazines

Notes

External links
 Muse India

Magazines established in 2005
Mass media in Hyderabad, India
Indian literature websites
2005 establishments in Andhra Pradesh
Bi-monthly magazines published in India
Online literary magazines